Eucamptognathus pernix is a species of ground beetle in the subfamily Pterostichinae. It was described by Deuve in 1981.

References

Eucamptognathus
Beetles described in 1981